Live 'n' Kickin' is the second album by the rock group Kingfish.  It was recorded live at the Roxy in West Hollywood, California. It was released as an LP in 1977 by Jet Records.  It was released on CD in Germany in 1989.

Though guitarist Bob Weir played with the band during the performance, he had returned to playing full time with the Grateful Dead by the time the album was produced. With the goal of forging a separate identity for Kingfish, tracks containing Weir's playing and singing were therefore removed from the mix, except where absolutely crucial to continuity or where his guitar or vocals bled onto the drum track.

Track listing
Side one
 "Good-Bye Yer Honor" (Dave Torbert, Tim Hovey, Matthew Kelly) – 2:47
 "Juke" (Walter Jacobs) – 2:29
 "Mule Skinner Blues" (George Vaughn, Jimmie Rodgers) – 4:24
 "I Hear You Knockin'" (Pearl King, Dave Bartholomew) – 4:16
 "Hypnotize" (Kelly, Torbert) – 5:40
Side two
 "Jump for Joy" (John Carter, Tim Gilbert) – 3:32
 "Overnight Bag" (Carter, Gilbert) – 3:47
 "Jump Back" (Rufus Thomas) – 3:47
 "Shake and Fingerpop" (Autry DeWalt, Lawrence Horn, Willie Woods) – 3:51
 "Around and Around" (Chuck Berry) – 5:16

Personnel
Kingfish
 Dave Torbert – lead vocals, bass guitar
 Matthew Kelly – guitar, harmonica, vocals
 Robbie Hoddinott – lead guitar
 Chris Herold – drums, percussion
 Bob Weir – guitar, vocals; lead vocals on "Mule Skinner Blues", "Around and Around"
Production
 Produced by Matthew Kelly, Dave Torbert
 Executive producer: Robert Gregory Nelson
 Recording, mixing: Ray Thompson, Mike Carver
 Recording engineer: Tim Hovey
 Technical assistance: Rob Taylor
 Mastering: Paul Stubblebine
 Photography: Gary Regester, Julie Bennett, Frank Moffett

References

Bob Weir albums
Kingfish (band) albums
1997 live albums
albums recorded at the Roxy Theatre